Pedro Brolo Vila (born 3 February 1981) is a Guatemalan economist, diplomat and politician who served as Minister of Foreign Affairs from 14 January 2020 to 31 January 2022.

He was appointed by President-elect Alejandro Giammattei to occupy that ministry. Previously he was a candidate for Mayor of Guatemala City in the 2019 municipal election, he was in fifth place obtained 9,449 and 2.2% of the votes.

Biography
Brolo is an entrepreneur and economist. He has a specialization in Human Rights, Climate Change and Public Policies. He also has a degree in Business Administration and a master's degree in Analysis and Reliability Management.

He worked as Chief Financial Officer of the Organization of American States in Guatemala and advisor to the offices of the Organization of American States of Ecuador and Honduras. Brolo was appointed as Delegate for the Truth Commission in Honduras, and has worked in the Congress of the Republic as a political analyst.

Brolo was proclaimed candidate for mayor by the Vamos in March 2019, being defeated by Mayor Ricardo Quiñónez Lemus of the Unionist Party in 16 June 2019. Brolo was defeated and obtained fifth place with more than 9,000 votes and 2.2% of the votes.

President-elect Alejandro Giammattei appointed Brolo as Minister of Foreign Affairs and declared that «Brolo will be the youngest Foreign Minister in the history of Guatemala.» However, that comment is incorrect, since there were several younger ones including Guillermo Toriello Garrido, Jorge Skinner-Klée, and Luis Molina Bedoya.

References

1981 births
Living people
Foreign ministers of Guatemala
Guatemalan diplomats
Guatemalan economists
Guatemalan politicians
People from Guatemala City
Vamos (Guatemala) politicians